The 1983 Player's International Canadian Open was a tennis tournament played on outdoor hard courts. The men's tournament was held at the Jarry Park Stadium in Montreal in Canada and was part of the 1983 Volvo Grand Prix while the women's tournament was held at the National Tennis Centre in Toronto in Canada and was part of the 1983 Virginia Slims World Championship Series. The men's tournament was held from August 8 through August 14, 1983, while the women's tournament was held from August 15 through August 21, 1983.

Finals

Men's singles

 Ivan Lendl defeated  Anders Järryd 6–2, 6–2
 It was Lendl's 5th title of the year and the 39th of his career.

Women's singles
 Martina Navratilova defeated  Chris Evert-Lloyd 6–4, 4–6, 6–1
 It was Navratilova's 20th title of the year and the 170th of her career.

Men's doubles
 Sandy Mayer /  Ferdi Taygan defeated  Tim Gullikson /  Tom Gullikson 6–3, 6–4
 It was Mayer's 2nd title of the year and the 30th of his career. It was Taygan's only title of the year and the 18th of his career.

Women's doubles
 Anne Hobbs /  Andrea Jaeger defeated  Rosalyn Fairbank /  Candy Reynolds 6–4, 5–7, 7–5
 It was Hobbs' 3rd title of the year and the 4th of her career. It was Jaeger's 2nd title of the year and the 11th of her career.

References

External links
 
 Association of Tennis Professionals (ATP) tournament profile
 Women's Tennis Association (WTA) tournament profile

Player's Canadian Open
Player's Canadian Open
Player's Canadian Open
Player's Canadian Open
Canadian Open (tennis)